Howard David Johnson (born 2 September 1954) is an American photorealist illustrator (drawer, painter, digital artist) of portrait, historical, mythological/religious art. He works in a variety of mixed media ranging from oil on canvas to digital media. He combines traditional style and methods with digital techniques.

Early life
Born in Mötsch (a district of Bitburg), West Germany, the son of an American Air Force officer stationed at Bitburg Air Base.

He was trained at the University of Texas at Austin College of Fine Art and began his career working as a scientific illustrator for their School of Paleontology reconstructing dinosaurs in 1974.

Career

Johnson has illustrated for books, magazines, games, television programs and computer software. Clients include
the National Geographic Society, Oxford University Press, Universal, Paramount and Disney Studios, PBS television, The History Channel, ABC TV, CBS TV, Warner Home Video, Adobe Photoshop, Doubleday, and Penguin.

His art has been licensed for coins and statues by The
Bradford Exchange.

Notes

TÁIN BÓ CÚAILNGE by Easton Press

External links
Realistic Art: The Galleries of Howard David Johnson

1954 births
Living people
20th-century American painters
American male painters
21st-century American painters
21st-century American male artists
American illustrators
20th-century American male artists